The 2003–04 Virginia Cavaliers men's basketball team represented the University of Virginia during the 2003–04 NCAA Division I men's basketball season. The team was led by sixth-year head coach Pete Gillen, and played their home games at University Hall in Charlottesville, Virginia as members of the Atlantic Coast Conference.

Last season
The Cavaliers had a record of 16–16, with a conference record of 6–10. They appeared in the 2003 National Invitation Tournament, where they lost in the second round to eventual champion St. John's.

Roster

Schedule 

|-
!colspan=9 style="background:#00214e; color:#f56d22;"| Exhibition

|-
!colspan=9 style="background:#00214e; color:#f56d22;"| Regular season

|-
!colspan=9 style="background:#00214e; color:#f56d22;"| ACC Tournament

|-
!colspan=9 style="background:#00214e; color:#f56d22;"| National Invitation Tournament

References

Virginia Cavaliers men's basketball seasons
Virginia
Virginia
Virginia Cavaliers men's basketball
2004 in sports in Virginia